Chie Fueki (born 1973) is a Japanese American painter. She has had an active career exhibiting her work in commercial galleries and has been represented by Mary Boone Gallery in New York City and Shoshana Wayne gallery in Santa Monica, California. Fueki's intricate paintings combine influences from both Eastern and Western traditions. She currently lives and works in Beacon, New York.

Early life and education
Fueki was born in Yokohama, Japan, in 1973. She spent her childhood in São Paulo, Brazil. Fueki studied at the Ringling School of Art & Design in Sarasota, Florida, receiving a BFA in 1996. She received her MFA from Yale University, in New Haven, Connecticut, in 1998. Fueki cites Leslie Lerner (Ringling School of Art & Design) and Catherine Murphy (Yale University) as important professors and mentors, and has included references and homages to them in her work.

Artistic practice
Fueki's intricately patterned and detailed paintings, often created on mulberry paper or wood panel, combine influences from both Eastern and Western decorative and folk arts and range in subject from sports imagery to more traditional subjects such as memento mori and portraits of friends. Laura Newman wrote that the shimmering surfaces in Fueki's paintings "give the works a sensuous, intoxicating delight of the sort more often associated with decoration than with thoughtful contemporary painting." 

Beyond the surfaces lie rich emotional and sometimes humorous content. Fueki's paintings incorporate symbolism from art of the Early Renaissance to ukiyo-e art of Japan and inspiration "from all the great influences in my life," including Piero della Francesca to Philip Guston and her contemporaries. "[The] present moment always looks away. Everyone knows that," said Fueki. Often fragmented, seemingly quilted and embroidered, the cosmic and eternal are evoked in depictions of every day life, existing between painted layers of paper.

Exhibitions & collections
Chie Fueki has had solo exhibitions with Bellwether, Bill Maynes, Mary Boone, and DC Moore galleries in New York; Shoshana Wayne gallery in Santa Monica, CA; and the Orlando Museum of Art in Florida. Her paintings have appeared in group exhibitions at MoMA PS1, Frederick Freiser gallery, and Susan Inglett gallery in New York. Fueki's work is held in public collections, including the Modern Art Museum of Fort Worth, TX; Orlando Museum of Art, FL; San Jose Museum of Art, CA;  the Hirshhorn Museum, Washington, D.C.; and the Pizzuti Collection at Columbus Museum of Art, OH.

Awards 
In 2021, Fueki was awarded the Joan Mitchell Fellowship from the Joan Mitchell Foundation. In 2022 she received a Guggenheim Foundation Fellowship.

References

1973 births
Living people
20th-century American women artists
20th-century Japanese women artists
20th-century Japanese artists
21st-century American women artists
21st-century Japanese women artists
21st-century Japanese artists
People from Yokohama
Yale School of Art alumni